Carex brevicuspis is a tussock-forming perennial in the family Cyperaceae. It is native to eastern parts of Asia.

See also
List of Carex species

References

brevicuspis
Plants described in 1903
Taxa named by Charles Baron Clarke
Flora of China
Flora of Taiwan